Columnar jointing of volcanic rocks exists in many places on Earth. Perhaps the most famous basalt lava flow in the world is the Giant's Causeway in Northern Ireland, in which the vertical joints form polygonal columns and give the impression of having been artificially constructed.

Notable columnar jointed volcanics

Africa
 Bugarama in Rusizi, Rwanda Columnar jointing in Rusizi district, Nzahaha Sector. This may have formed from contractional cooling of basaltic lavas.
 Foreke Quarry, Foreke Dachang, Cameroon
 Ikom Columnar Basalt in Cross River State, Nigeria 
 Numan, Nigeria
 "Organ Pipes" near Twyfelfontein, Namibia
 Rochester Falls, Mauritius
 Seliana, Tunisia

South Asia

 India

In India, columnars are found in several places across the volcanic traps such as 6.5 crore or 65 million years ago (Mya) old deccan traps in South India and 14.5 crore or 145 mya old Rajmahal Traps in Eastern India.

 Karnataka
 St. Mary's Island columnars near Malpe in Udupi district of Karnataka state.

 Madhya Pradesh

 Kavadia Pahad columnars: Forest area near Bagli & Pipari village of Dewas District in Madhya Pradesh. The rock formation is at Kavadia Pahad which is a series of seven mountain ranges.

 Linga columnars: 11km south of Chhindwara city.

 Narsinghpur columnar joints in Deccan Basalts near Narsinghpur.

 Maharashtra

 Bandivade columnars: found at Bandivade village bear Panhala in  Kolhapur district of Maharashtra.

 Gilbert Hill columnars in Andheri suburb of  Mumbai in Maharashtra.

 Manmad columnars

 Muktagiri columnars jointing in basalt lava flows of Muktagiri section in Amravati district. 

 Telangana

Adilabad district columnars.

 Borilalguda columnars: Found  on a small hillock inside the reserve forest of Borilalguda village in Kerameri tehsil of Komaram Bheem Asifabad district.

 Medak district columnars.

 Nizamabad   district columnars.

 Rangareddy  district columnars.

West Asia
Armenia
Garni Gorge, Armenia 
 Near Saint Sarkis Cathedral, Yerevan, Armenia
Turkey

Basalt Rocks Natural Monument, Boyabat, Sinop Province, Turkey

Middle East
Iran
Maku, West Azerbaijan Province, Iran 
Mount Damavand, Iran 
Sarbisheh, Iran
Syria / Israel (disputed)
 Meshushim River (Hexagons River), Hexagons pool, Golan Heights,

East Asia

China
 Heiyuhe Columnar Joints (黑鱼河柱状节理) [Xianrenqiao (仙人桥)], Longchuan River (龙川江) & Black Fish River, Tengchong
Hong Kong
 Basalt Island area, Hong Kong; including High Island Reservoir area, Hong Kong; although the High Island Reservoir is not basalt but rhyolitic tuff, rich in potash feldspar and quartz phenocrysts.
Taiwan
Tongpan Basalt (桶盤玄武岩石柱), Tongpan Island and Hujing Island (Table island, 虎井嶼), Penghu Islands 
 The Whale Cave, on the seashore, in Penghu County
Japan
 Natsudomari Peninsula, Hiranai, Aomori
 Kawazu 7 waterfalls area, Izu Peninsula, Shizuoka
 Tōjinbō, Mikuni, Fukui
 Genbudō, Toyooka, Hyōgo
 Takachiho-kyo gorge, Takachiho, Miyazaki
 Keya no Oto, Itoshima, Fukuoka
 Tatami-ishi, Kumejima, Okinawa

Mongolia
 Kharandaa Khad in Taishir district, on Zavkhan River
Russia
 Chukchi Peninsula in Chukotka Autonomous Okrug
 Cape Stolbchatiy, Kuril Islands, Russia
South Korea
 Jusangjeolli, Seogwipo, Jeju Island, South Korea

Southeast Asia
 Indonesia

 Gunung Padang Megalithic Site in West Java is also a manmade archaeological site.

Malaysia 

 In Teck Guan Cocoa Village and in Giram River, Kampung Balung Cocos Tawau, Sabah, Malaysia.
Philippines
 Dunsulan Falls in Mount Samat, Pilar, Bataan 
 Bulingan Falls in Lamitan, Basilan
Thailand
 Mon Hin Kong, in a mountainous area of the Phi Pan Nam Range near Na Phun, Wang Chin District, Phrae Province, Thailand
Vietnam

 Da Dia Cliff — The Cliff of Stone Plates, An Ninh Đông Village, Tuy An District, Phú Yên Province, Vietnam
 Yen Islet- An Hòa Village, Tuy An District, Phú Yên Province
 Vuc Hom Fall - An Lĩnh Village, Tuy An District, Phú Yên Province
 Vuc Song Fall - An Lĩnh Village, Tuy An District, Phú Yên Province
 Battle Fall - Vĩnh Sơn Village, Vĩnh Thạnh District, Bình Định Province
 Takon Citadel - K8 (old name: Kon Blò), Vĩnh Sơn Village, Vĩnh Thạnh District, Bình Định Province

Central America
El Salvador
 Cascada Los Tercios, Suchitoto
Concepción waterfall, Aculco
Panama
 Los Ladrillos, Boquete
Costa Rica
Bajo Rodriguez, San Lorenzo de San Ramon

Europe

Faroe Islands
 Froðba, Hov
 Hvalba and Trongisvágur, Suðuroy

France
 Thueyts, Jaujac and Fabras, Ardèche
 Saint-Flour, Cantal
 Chilhac
 Saint-Arcons
 Prades
 Saint-Clément
 Moulin-Béraud
 La Tour-d'Auvergne
 Bort-les-Orgues
 Scandola Nature Reserve, Corsica

Germany
 Linz am Rhein, Mendig, Mayen, Rhineland-Palatinate
 Hoher Hagen (Dransfeld), Lower Saxony
 Rhön, North Bavaria
 Stolpen, Saxony
 Scharfenstein, Hesse
 Weiselberg, Saarland

Greenland
 Qeqertarsuaq, Disko Island

Hungary
 Badacsony
 Bér
 Szanda
 Szilváskő
 Hegyestű
 Szent-György-hegy
 Gulács
 Haláp
 Hajagos
 Uzsa

Iceland
 Aldeyjarfoss, Þingeyjarsveit
 Borgarvirki
 Dverghamrar, Kirkjubæjarklaustur
 Gerðuberg
 Hellnahraun near Arnarstapi, Snæfellsbær
 Hljóðaklettar, Jökulsárgljúfur
 Kirkjugólf, Kirkjubæjarklaustur
 Kálfshamarsvík, Austur-Húnavatnssýsla
 Litlanesfoss, Fljótsdalshreppur
 Reynisdrangar and Reynisfjara, Vík í Mýrdal
 Stuðlagil, East of Iceland
 Svartifoss, Skaftafell

Italy
 Alcantara River Gorges, Sicily
 Cyclopean Isles, Sicily
 Motta Sant'Anastasia neck, Sicily
 Lake Bolsena, Lazio
 Seiser Alm, South Tyrol

Portugal
 Rocha dos Bordões cliffs, Flores, Azores
 Pico de Ana Ferreira, Porto Santo
 Penedo do Lexim, Mafra

Sardinia
Cuccureddu de Zeppara, Guspini
Capu Nieddu, Cuglieri
Is Aruttas Santas, Villaurbana

Slovakia
 Šomoška

Spain
 Punta Baja, Cabo de Gata-Níjar Natural Park, Andalusia
 Castellfollit de la Roca, Girona
 Fruiz, Biscay
 Pitón volcánico de Cancarix, Albacete
 Los Órganos, La Gomera, Canary Islands

United Kingdom
 Giant's Causeway, Northern Ireland
 The islands of Canna, Eigg, and Muck, Scotland
 Cullernose Point, near Craster, Northumberland, England
 The northern part of the Isle of Skye, Scotland
 The Isle of Mull and the nearby beach of Morvern, Scotland
 Samson's ribs, Scotland
 Fingal's Cave and Staffa, Scotland
 Pen Anglas, Pembrokeshire, Wales
 Ulva, Scotland

Other
 Panská Skála, Kamenický Šenov, Czech Republic
 Zlatý vrch, Česká Kamenice, Czech Republic
 Sioni, Mtskheta-Mtianeti, Georgia
 Milos, Greece

 Coloanele de bazalt de la Racoș, Romania
 Thunderstruck Rocks (Detunatele), Romania
Bazaltove, Ukraine

North America

 Canada
 North Mountain, Nova Scotia
 Grand Manan Island (western shorelines), New Brunswick
 Brandywine Falls Provincial Park, British Columbia
 Cardiff Mountain, Chilcotin Plateau, British Columbia
 Keremeos Columns, Keremeos, British Columbia
 Aberdeen Columns, Lavington, British Columbia
 Wells Gray Provincial Park, British Columbia (Moul Falls, Dragon's Tongue, Helmcken Falls)
 Mount Edziza Volcanic Complex, British Columbia
 Kelowna, British Columbia (Mount Boucherie, Spion Kopje)
 Devils Woodpile, British Columbia (Cathedral Provincial Park)
 Rouyn-Noranda, Quebec
 Simpson Island, Lake Superior National Marine Conservation Area, Rossport, Ontario
Tow Hill, British Columbia
Level Mountain, British Columbia

Caribbean
 Pain de sucre (sugar loaf) Îles des Saintes

United States
 Block Mountain, Montana (along the lower Big Hole River)
 Boiling Pots, Hilo, Hawaii (exposed by the Wailuku River)
 Cascade Range, Oregon, in Eugene and southeast of Molalla
 Columbia Plateau, Washington
 Columns of the Giants, Stanislaus National Forest, California
 Compton Peak in Shenandoah National Park, Virginia
 Devils Postpile National Monument, California
 Devils Tower National Monument, Wyoming
 Elk River Falls, Idaho
 Hughes Mountain, Missouri
 Hyalite Falls, Gallatin Mountain Range, Montana
 Whiterock Canyon, New Mexico, various cliffs and mesas from Otowi to Cochiti.
 Latourell Falls, Oregon
 Mount Tom (Massachusetts)
 Palisades Sill, New Jersey and New York, along the Hudson River
Paul Bunyan's Woodpile, Juab County, Utah
 Sheepeater Cliff & multiple other areas in Yellowstone National Park
 Hemlock Falls, First Watchung Mountain, South Mountain Reservation, South Orange, New Jersey
 Spokane, Washington (W Airport Dr. onramp)
 Stanford Rock, Lake Tahoe, California
 Sweetwater Canyon, Madison County, Montana
 Turtleback Mountain, Moultonborough, New Hampshire
 Whatcom County, Washington

Mexico

 Basaltic Prisms of Santa María Regla in Huasca de Ocampo, Hidalgo
 Salto de San Anton in Cuernavaca, Morelos
 Flor De La Vida Retreat in Mascota, Jalisco

Oceania

Australia
Bombo Latite, Bombo, New South Wales
 Narooma Basalt, Narooma, New South Wales
Fingal Head, New South Wales
Battery Rock Rest Area, Located on the Golden Highway, 15 kilometres southeast of Merriwa and 19 kilometres northwest of Sandy Hollow on the western side of the highway. NSW
Sawn Rocks, Mount Kaputar National Park, New South Wales
Glass House Mountains, Queensland
Burleigh Head National Park, Queensland
Mount Scoria Conservation Park, Thangool, Queensland
 Ben Lomond National Park,  Tasmania
 Cape Raoul, Tasmania
 Ruined Castle, Falls Creek, Victoria 
 Organ Pipes National Park, Victoria 
 Barfold Gorge, Campaspe River, Victoria
 Black Point, D'Entrecasteaux National Park, Western Australia
 Wyalup-Rocky Point, Bunbury, Western Australia

Federated States of Micronesia
 Pwisehn Malek, Pohnpei, Caroline Islands

New Zealand
 Blackhead and Second Beach, Dunedin
Chatham Islands
 The Organ Pipes, Mount Cargill, Dunedin
 Mt Somers
 Bridal Veil Falls (Waikato), Raglan

South America
 Ancud Volcanic Complex, Chile
 Mocho Volcano, Chile
 Pino Hachado Caldera, Neuquén Province, Argentina
 Pedras do Cambira, Apucarana, Brazil

Mars

Several exposures of columnar jointing have been discovered on the planet Mars by the High Resolution Imaging Science Experiment (HiRISE) camera, which is carried by the Mars Reconnaissance Orbiter (MRO).
 Marte Vallis

Uses

A likely Hindu-origin ancient site at Gunung Padang in West Java, Indonesia was built by horizontally laying basalt columns to form terraces on the slope of a hill and creating open-roofed chambers by erecting vertical columns. A now-ruined thirteenth-century religious complex called Nan Madol was built using columnar basalt quarried from various locations on the island of Pohnpei in Micronesia.

Gallery

See also
 Ringing rocks

References

 
Columnar